Silene douglasii is a species of flowering plant in the family Caryophyllaceae known by the common name Douglas's catchfly.

It is native to western North America from British Columbia to California to Wyoming, where it grows in several habitat types, including forests, woodlands, and coastal scrub.

Description
Silene douglasii is a tufted perennial herb growing from a branching caudex and taproot, its stems decumbent to erect and up to 70 centimeters long. The stem is coated in curly or feltlike gray-white hairs. The lance-shaped leaves are up to 6 centimeters long on the lower stem and are smaller farther up.

Each flower is encapsulated in a cylindrical inflated calyx of sepals lined with ten green or purple-red veins. It is open at the tip, revealing five white, pink or purplish petals, each with two wide lobes at the tip.

Varieties
There are three varieties of this species. 
Silene douglasii var. douglasii 
Silene douglasii var. oraria — Seabluff catchfly, rare and endemic to the Oregon coastline.
Silene douglasii var. rupinae

References

External links
Jepson Manual Treatment of Silene douglasii
USDA Plants Profile for Silene douglasii (Douglas catchfly)
CalFlora Database: Silene douglasii (Douglas Catchfly,  Douglas' campion, Douglas's catchfly, seabluff catchfly)
Flora of North America
Washington Burke Museum
UC Photos gallery: Silene douglasii

douglasii
Flora of the Northwestern United States
Flora of California
Flora of British Columbia
Flora of the Cascade Range
Flora of the Klamath Mountains
Flora of the Sierra Nevada (United States)
Natural history of the California chaparral and woodlands
Flora without expected TNC conservation status